Zainub Verjee DFA LL. D. (born 1956) is a Kenya-born Canadian video artist, curator, writer, arts administrator and public intellectual. She began her career in the Vancouver arts community of the 1970s, which was steeped in interdisciplinary, intermedia, and intercultural practices. Having made her mark as an emerging artist, she shifted the emphasis of her work to curatorial, administrative and policy arenas. Applying the insight, creativity and criticality of an artist, she has brought “institutional critique” into the workings of the institution itself. Deeply engaged with the UK’s British Black Arts, Tactical Video Movement, Third Cinema and the post-Bandung Conference decolonization, Verjee has been embedded in the history of women’s labour in British Columbia. In February 2020 she was awarded the 2020 Governor General’s Award in Visual and Media Arts for “outstanding contribution to the arts”. In 2021 she was conferred an honorary doctorate by the OCAD University recognizing her outstanding contribution to arts, racial and gender equity  She was elected as a Senior Fellow of the Massey College at University of Toronto in the Fall of 2021. Earlier she was appointed as McLaughlin College Fellow at the York University. In 2022 she was conferred Doctor of Fine Arts, honours causa, by Nova Scotia College of Art and Design NSCAD University, Halifax

In the summer of 2021 she had a solo show Speech Acts at Centre A:Vancouver International Centre for Contemporary Asian Art. Her work has been shown internationally, including at the Museum of Modern Art and the Venice Biennale. She was Film Distribution Manager at the Women in Focus Society, Vancouver. She was involved with the British Black Arts Movement of the 1980s. Zainub offered the connecting link between the Black British Art Movement and Vancouver. In 1989 Verjee cofounded In Visible Colours with Lorraine Chan of the National Film Board, an international film and video festival and symposium featuring the work of women of colour. At the Courtauld Institute of Art in a keynote on In Visible Colours as an experiment in solidarity, Third cinema, women and birth of an aesthetic she spoke of as a witness to the unfolding of the decolonization process. It was the same time period when a new Afro-Asian solidarity emerged in the form of the Bandung Conference—a counter to the West, and a non- Western basis for organizing a non-alignment front to counter the Cold War. Following the success of In Visible Colours, she was invited by the Jeanne Sauvé Youth Foundation to lead a workshop on International Forum 1992: globalization and nationalism at the first International Conference for Young Leaders, Montreal. In 1992 she was awarded National Film Board Fellowship as part of New Initiatives in Film for women of colour and aboriginal women.

She led the Artists’ Coalition for Local Colour, raising racism charges against the Vancouver Art Gallery.

Writer and critic 
As a writer and critic she has been very prolific. She was contributor to a special double issue of the Capilano Review, the first to be entirely devoted to women, featuring thirty-seven British Columbia women writers and visual artists, all working within the theme of struggle, local and global.

Career 

In the 1990s, she worked for a decade as the Executive Director of the Western Front Society in Vancouver.
She has been active as an arts administrator in the field of cultural policy and cultural diplomacy for over 30 years. Her decades of work in the sector has led to appointments on boards, steering committees and invitations to speak on the national and international fora. In addition to holding positions at Women in Focus, Citizen’s Forum on Canada’s Future -The Spicer Commission, Canada Council for the Arts, and Department of Canadian Heritage, she was engaged by Gordon Campbell, Canadian diplomat and the 35th Mayor of Vancouver on his landmark Vancouver Arts Initiative. Among many appointments to Boards, she is proud of her work at the B.C. Arts Board that led to the formation of the B.C. Arts Council. In 2017 she was appointed as the Director of the International Art Gallery at the Jubilee International Arts Festival in Lisbon. Given her expertise in cultural policy and cultural diplomacy, she was at the forefront of the cultural policy work in the 1980s-2000s in Canada and internationally working on issues of Artist Labour, Racial Equity, and Culture Trade. She is at forefront in writing about how COVID-19  exposed hypocrisy about the artists and their labour. She also co-authored a letter, on behalf of 75000 artists, to the Prime Minister of Canada on issue of Basic Income. She is spearheading a movement on Basic Income for the artists which has become an international issue and she was invited to speak at the Creative Directions Festival of Monash University, Australia and giving keynote on issues of labour and political economy of arts.

Appointed in 2015, Zainub is currently the Executive Director of the Ontario Association of Art Galleries.

Born in Nairobi in 1956, Zainub is a fourth generation Kenyan. She moved to Canada in the 1970s to study economics at Simon Fraser University. Verjee family is known for its philanthropy around the world.

Artist 

"Zainub’s career in curatorship, policy and administration has been consistent and contiguous with what might be termed a critical transversal aesthetic. Zainub’s movement, from art to institutional work, as the pursuit of a more effective transversal praxis."

Embedded in a Fluxus ethos, apart from her practice as a multidisciplinary artist, she is a programmer/curator, critic, writer, and activist. Her artworks have been shown at the Venice Biennale, Museum of Modern Art, NY, Portland Institute of Contemporary Art, Portland US, Centre d’Art Contemporain de Basse-Normandie, France, Museo de Arte Carrillo Gil, México, D. F. (Mexico City, Mexico), M.S.U. Baroda, India, Embassy Cultural House, London,  Art Gallery of Alberta and resides in private and public collections (Vancouver Art Gallery, Canada).

Selected exhibitions 
 1993, Racy-Sexy: Race, Culture and Sexuality, Centre A, Vancouver.
 1994, New Canadian Video, Museum of Modern Art, New York, NY.
 1995, TransCulture, Venice Biennale, Venice, Italy.
 1997, Traversing Territory, Part II: Road Movies in a Post-Colonial Landscape, Portland Institute of Contemporary Art, Portland, OR.
 1997, Tracing Cultures III, Ismaili Jamatkhana and Centre, Burnaby, BC.
 Anon. The Instability of the Feminist Subject : A Series of 20 Postcards by Artists. Banff, Alta: [The Banff Centre for the Arts], 1992.DOSSIER: 321 - BANFF CENTRE FOR THE ARTS, The (Banff, Alta)
 Paterson, Andrew J.. Time, Space & Realities : An Exhibition of Video Tapes by John Orentlicher, Doug Porter, Catherine Richards, Janice Tanaka, Zainub Verjee. Toronto, Ont.: A Space, 1995. 
 Cron, Marie-Michèle. Circonvolutions. Montréal, Qc: Opera, 1995.DOSSIER: 390 - OPERA : OUVERTURE PANCULTURELLE POUR L'ÉCHANGE ET LA RÉALISATION DE L'ART / PANCULTURAL OVERTURE FOR EXCHANGE AND REALIZATION OF ART (Montréal, Qc)
 Kibbins, Gary and Philip, Marlene Nourbese and Campbell, Colin and Barber, Bruce and Christakos, Margaret and Paterson, Andrew James and McLeod, Kathy and Shaw, Nancy and Jeffries, Pat and McCormack, Thelma and Robertson, Clive and Diamond, Sara and Harry, Isobel and Adams, Don and Bean, Robert and Norman, Abigail and Sullivan, Joan and Waterson, Georgia and Yael, B. H. and Amis, Ric and The Ontario Coalition for Abortion Clinics. Fuse 11: 3. Fall. (1987).
 Anon. Video Out Distribution Catalogue. Vancouver, BC: Satellite Video Exchange Society, 1996. DOSSIER: 390 - SATELLITE VIDEO EXCHANGE SOCIETY (Video Inn + Video Out, Vancouver, BC)
 Anon. 1996 Video Reference Guide Catalogued by V/Tape. Toronto, Ont.: V Tape, 1996. DOSSIER: 390 - VTAPE (Toronto, Ont.)
 Henry, Karen and Fife, Connie and Albahari, David and Jamal, Sherazad and Suleman, Zool and Xiao-ping, Li and Thomson, Grace Eiko. Tracing Cultures. Burnaby, BC: Burnaby Art Gallery, 1997. DOSSIER: 353 - BURNABY ART GALLERY (Burnaby)

In 1993 Verjee presented Ecoute s'il pleut (Listen if it's Raining), a French/English video poem to allow the viewer to experience the fullness of silence.

 Zainub Verjee, "Tautology 45", 2020, digital Image, Embassy Cultural House
 Group Exhibition, 2020 Governor General's Award Visual and Media Arts, Art Gallery of Alberta
 Group Exhibition, 2020 Redacted Artist Labour The Royal Society of Canada (RSC) and University of Alberta online project - 
The Engaging Creativities: Art in the Pandemic
 2021 Solo Show, Speech Acts:Zainub Verjee at Centre A
 2021 Group Exhibition, Asian Triennial Manchester,

References 

1956 births
Canadian video artists
Women video artists
Canadian Ismailis
Kenyan Ismailis
Simon Fraser University alumni
Living people